Elżbieta Szydłowska, married surname Grabowska (1748 – 1 June 1810), was a member of the Polish nobility, a mistress and possibly the morganatic wife of the last King of Poland, Stanisław August Poniatowski.

Biography 
Elżbieta Szydłowska was a daughter of Polish nobleman Teodor Kajetan Szydłowski, voivode of Płock, Lubicz coat of arms (1714–1792), and his wife, Teresa Witkowska, Nowina coat of arms (1722–1778). In 1768 she married a Polish noble, General Jan Jerzy Grabowski (died 1789). Some of the children of this marriage are thought to have actually been children of the last Polish–Lithuanian Commonwealth king, Stanisław August Poniatowski.

In 1789, she became a widow and possibly entered into a secret, morganatic marriage with the King, remaining known at court as his maîtresse-en-titre. However, Wirydianna Fiszerowa, a contemporary who knew her, reported that tales of this marriage only circulated after Poniatowski's death, and were spread about by Elżbieta herself, but were not generally believed. She was thought to have exercised some influence on the king during his reign perceived as negative, which made her unpopular.

In 1795, King Stanisław abdicated following the Third Partition of Poland, and lived in Grodno under Russian watch until, in 1796, Paul I of Russia invited him to Saint Petersburg. Elżbieta, with her two sons, Stanisław and Michał, took the king to Saint Petersburg to care for him there, and she lived with him until his sudden death in 1798. Afterwards, she returned to Warsaw, then under Prussian rule following the Partitions, where she became a patroness of the Tableau vivant there. She died in Warsaw on 1 June 1810, survived by four of her children.

She had three sons and two daughters with the king, and their second son, Michał Grabowski, distinguished himself in combat, eventually becoming a general in the army of the Duchy of Warsaw.

Issue 
Her children were:
 Stanisław
 Michał
 Casimir
 Aleksandra (13 April 1771 – 12 May 1789), who married Franciszek Salezy Krasicki in 1787
 Izabela Grabowska (1776–1858), who married Walenty Faustyn Sobolewski in 1795
 Constance

References 

 H. P Kosk generalicja polska t. 1 Oficyna Wydawnicza "Ajaks" Pruszków 1998.

Mistresses of Stanisław August Poniatowski
19th-century Polish nobility
1748 births
1810 deaths
18th-century Polish nobility
Morganatic spouses
Szydłowski family